The 1947–48 BAA season was the second season of the Basketball Association of America. The 1948 BAA Playoffs ended with the Baltimore Bullets winning the BAA Championship, beating the Philadelphia Warriors in 6 games in the BAA Finals. 

Although not celebrated at the time, this season was historic, with Wataru Misaka of the New York Knicks becoming the first person of color to play in modern professional basketball.

The NBA recognizes the three BAA seasons as part of its own history so the 1947–48 BAA season is considered the second NBA season.

Notable occurrences

Preseason events

Cleveland, Detroit, Pittsburgh and Toronto folded before the season started, leaving the BAA with only seven teams. (All cities except Pittsburgh would get new NBA teams in future years.) The Baltimore Bullets were brought into the league from the American Basketball League to provide a more convenient number, eight.

Final standings

Eastern Division

Western Division

Playoffs

Statistics leaders

Note: Prior to the 1969–70 season, league leaders in points and assists were determined by totals rather than averages.

BAA awards

All-BAA First Team
C Ed Sadowski, Boston Celtics
F Joe Fulks, Philadelphia Warriors
F Howie Dallmar, Philadelphia Warriors
F Bob Feerick, Washington Capitols
G Max Zaslofsky, Chicago Stags
All-BAA Second Team
G Buddy Jeannette, Baltimore Bullets
C Stan Miasek, Chicago Stags
G Carl Braun, New York Knicks
G Fred Scolari, Washington Capitols
G John Logan, St. Louis Bombers
BAA Rookie of the Year
F/G Paul Hoffman, Baltimore Bullets

Notes

References